Taskrabbit Inc is an online and mobile marketplace that matches freelance labor with local demand, allowing consumers to find help with everyday tasks, including furniture assembly, moving, delivery, and handyperson work. Founded in 2008 by Leah Busque, the company received $37.7 million in venture capital funding 2012 and currently has tens of thousands of "Taskers" available to help consumers across a wide variety of categories. Busque founded Taskrabbit when she had no time to buy dog food, basing it on the idea of "neighbors helping neighbors". In 2017, Taskrabbit was acquired by INGKA group (IKEA). In 2022, Taskrabbit announced that it would close its physical offices, including its San Francisco, California headquarters, and transition to becoming a remote-first company. This was part of a wave of several major tech companies closing headquarters in San Francisco in the wake of the COVID-19 pandemic.

History
The precursor of Taskrabbit was RunMyErrand, which was launched in 2008 in Boston, Massachusetts, with the first 100 "runners". In 2009, Tim Ferriss became an advisor to the firm after meeting Busque at Facebook's startup incubator, fbFund. The firm accumulated $1.8 million in seed funding from venture capital firms and hired the company's first full-time employee, Brian Leonard, a software engineer with whom Leah Busque had worked at IBM.

In April 2010, Busque changed the name of the company from RunMyErrand to Taskrabbit. By June 2010, Busque and team moved across the country and opened operations in the San Francisco Bay Area. One year later, in May 2011, Taskrabbit closed a $5 million Series A financing round from Shasta Ventures, First Round Capital, Baseline Ventures, Floodgate Fund, Collaborative Fund, 500 Startups, and The Mesh author Lisa Gansky. At that time, the firm had 13 employees and 2,000 participating "Taskrabbits". Within the next year, the firm expanded from Boston and the San Francisco Bay Area to New York City, New York; Chicago, Illinois; Los Angeles, California; and Orange County, California.

In July 2011, Taskrabbit launched an app which allowed users to post a task with an iPhone. In October 2011, Busque hired Eric Grosse, the co-founder and former president of Hotwire.com, as the firm's new CEO so she could focus on product development. In December 2011, Taskrabbit received an additional $17.8 million in a Series B round of funding. At the time, the firm had 35 employees and generated $4 million in business each month.

In 2012, Busque reassumed the role of CEO, with Gross staying on with the company's board of directors, advising on strategy and operations. In January 2013, the company hired Stacy Brown-Philpot, former Google Ventures Entrepreneur-in-Residence and a veteran leader of global operations at Google, as the company's first COO.

In March 2013, a new tool for “Taskrabbit Business" was introduced which allowed businesses to hire temporary workers from the Taskrabbit users, with a 26 percent commission.

Reboot

The company launched its first international market in London, United Kingdom in November 2013. Because of declines both in bids and in completed and accepted tasks in the U.S., the company chose to test a new system in London; instead of an eBay-inspired bidding model, Taskers would set their own rates and schedules, and when a new job was posted that matched their profile, the platform would send them an alert. The first to respond got the job. In London, the results were positive: almost all the company's metrics improved, and the average amount of money that individual Taskers on the platform were taking home increased.

On June 17, 2014, Taskrabbit announced and began implementing this change in all markets.  The new version was officially released on July 10, 2014, and was met with significant backlash from the Tasker community. Taskrabbit incorporated some of the feedback into an updated version of its app that launched on January 1, 2015, and has since experienced considerable growth. In 2014, Taskrabbit received 4,000 applications to be a Tasker. In 2015, that number grew to 15,000.

In April 2016, Taskrabbit promoted Stacy Brown-Philpot from chief operating officer to CEO, as founder and former CEO Leah Busque became executive chairwoman. She joined the company in May 2012 after serving as Google's senior director of Global Consumer Operations. After her promotion to CEO, she pledged to run Taskrabbit with “focused execution and strong cost discipline,” according to USA Today. During her tenure, Taskrabbit became “a successful global business that is strongly positioned for continued year-over-year growth” and “expanded to thousands of cities across the United States, Canada and Europe,” The New York Times reported.

Acquisition by IKEA
In September 2017, the IKEA Group announced it would acquire Taskrabbit, which would continue to operate independently. IKEA launched a furniture assembly service from Taskrabbit in March 2018.

In April 2018, the company was affected by a data breach.

Expansion
In 2018, Taskrabbit began its global expansion. In February 2018, Taskrabbit entered the UK by offering service in Birmingham, Bristol and Manchester, England, followed by expansion in December 2018 into the Brighton, Cardiff, Coventry, Liverpool & Warrington, Oxford, and Reading, U.K. markets.
 
In September 2018, it expanded across Canada with a rollout in Toronto, followed by service in Vancouver, Montreal, and other Canadian cities. At present, Taskrabbit is available in around 45 cities across the United States, Canada, and Britain, including Calgary, Edmonton, Halifax, Ottawa-Gatineau, Quebec City, and Winnipeg. 
 
In September 2019, it entered the French market by starting service in Paris and followed it with a rollout to other French cities.
 
A month later in October 2019, Germany became its fifth overseas market, with service first in Berlin, followed by Bochum, Cologne, Dortmund, Duisburg, Düsseldorf, Essen, Gelsenkirchen, Krefeld, Monchengladbach, Oberhausen, Wuppertal and surrounding areas of the Rhein-Ruhr. 
 
In January 2020, Taskrabbit started service across 39 cities in Spain.
 
In August 2020, Brown-Philpot stepped down as CEO. Taskrabbit named former Airbnb Global Operations Lead and UberEats Head of Courier Operations Ania Smith its new CEO. She also held director roles at Walmart eCommerce and Expedia.
 
Smith views trust as essential to Taskrabbit's service. She “heavily invests in making the distributed workforce feel connected and included” and “oversees on-the-ground teams whose sole job is to ensure one-on-one connections with Taskers,” according to "Fortune" magazine.  
 
Global expansion continued when Portugal became its seventh market in November 2020, and it began offering its services in Lisbon, Porto, Braga, Coimbra, and Faro. 
 
In March 2021, Taskrabbit launched in Italy in Rome and Milan.

In July 2022, Taskrabbit began offering service in Monaco.

Brand refresh
In May 2022, Taskrabbit launched a global brand refresh, introducing an all lower-case wordmark with two different "a" characters. The company also removed the image of the "rabbit" from its logo and updated its default brand colors.

Contractors
More than 200,000 independent workers use the Taskrabbit platform.  
 
In fiscal 2021, Taskrabbit saw a 67% year-over-year spike in active Taskers around the world, about a third of whom are actors and musicians. It now employs thousands of taskers in nine countries. Some have turned their Taskrabbit work into a full-time job.
 
In the United States, Taskers provide services across more than 35 categories, including furniture assembly, minor home repairs, mounting, help moving and more. On average, U.S. Taskers earn $48 per hour, although earnings vary by location. And many make more than $100,000 annually.

In popular culture
Taskrabbit was the basis for an episode of season three of Netflix's Unbreakable Kimmy Schmidt. The service was also parodied in The Simpsons episode "Dad Behavior" as ChoreMonkey, as well as in the iCarly (2021) episode "iGot Your Back" as PostRabbit.

In Netflix's holiday rom-com Single All The Way (2021), main character Nick subsidizes his career as a writer by working as a handyman for Taskrabbit.
 
In Peacock original crime thriller/comedy series Killing It (2022), cash-hungry character Jillian works for Taskrabbit. 
 
TBS’ American Dad! cartoon hit by Seth MacFarlane references Taskrabbit.
 
Netflix reality television show Magic for Humans shows the character Justin telecommuting with a Tasker in episode five of season two. 
 
HBO’s Silicon Valley series references Taskrabbit in episode seven of season six.
 
In season two/episode two of Peacock musical comedy Girls5eva, character Dawn searches Taskrabbit for geriatric button pushers with no opinions.

A Taskrabbit employee also appears in Cobra Kai.

References

External links
 

IKEA
Business services companies established in 2008
Online marketplaces of the United States
Companies based in San Francisco
Freelance marketplace websites
2017 mergers and acquisitions
Employment websites in the United States